Sabine Füsser (born 29 November 1974) is a German female canoeist who won six medals at senior level at the Wildwater Canoeing World Championships.

Medals at the World Championships
Senior

References

External links
 

1974 births
Living people
German female canoeists
Place of birth missing (living people)